Viktor Igorevich Kuzmichyov (born 19 March 1992) is a Russian former professional football player. He played as a midfielder. He could also play as a defender.

External links
 
 

1992 births
Footballers from Makhachkala
Living people
Russian footballers
Russia youth international footballers
Russia under-21 international footballers
Russian Premier League players
PFC Krylia Sovetov Samara players
Association football defenders
FC Rubin Kazan players
FC Saturn Ramenskoye players
FC Anzhi Makhachkala players
FC Tolyatti players